was a former Japanese football player and manager. He played for Japan national team.

Club career
Hosaka was born in Kofu on March 3, 1937. After graduating from Meiji University, he joined Furukawa Electric in 1959. He won 1960, 1961 and 1964 Emperor's Cup. In 1965, Furukawa Electric joined new league Japan Soccer League. He retired in 1968. He played 47 games in the league.

National team career
In November 1960, he was selected by the Japan national team for the 1962 World Cup qualification. At this qualification, on November 6, he debuted against South Korea. In 1962, he also played at the Asian Games. He was a regular goalkeeper in the early 1960s. In 1964, he was selected by Japan for the Summer Olympics in Tokyo. However, he did not compete, because he fractured his hand just before the Olympics. Instead, he was the team's reserve goalkeeper behind Kenzo Yokoyama.  He played 19 games for Japan until 1964.

Coaching career
After retirement, Hosaka became a manager for his local club Kofu SC in 1973. He managed until 1977.

On January 21, 2018, Hosaka died of pneumonia in Kofu at the age of 80.

National team statistics

References

External links
 
 
 Japan National Football Team Database

1937 births
2018 deaths
Meiji University alumni
Association football people from Yamanashi Prefecture
Japanese footballers
Japan international footballers
Japan Soccer League players
JEF United Chiba players
Olympic footballers of Japan
Footballers at the 1964 Summer Olympics
Footballers at the 1962 Asian Games
Japanese football managers
Association football goalkeepers
Asian Games competitors for Japan
Japanese sportsperson-politicians
People from Kōfu, Yamanashi